Aleksandr Aleksandrovich Tumasyan (born 15 October 1992) is an Armenian former football player who played as a midfielder.

International career
Tumasyan played his first international game with the national team on 31 May 2014, in a friendly against Algeria where he came in as a substitute for Artur Yuspashyan after 73 minutes.

Personal
His father is Aleksandr Tumasyan and his older brothers are Denis Tumasyan and Sergei Tumasyan.

References

1992 births
Living people
Armenian footballers
Russian footballers
Sportspeople from Rostov-on-Don
Russian people of Armenian descent
Association football midfielders
Armenia international footballers
FF Jaro players
Esiliiga players
Meistriliiga players
FCI Tallinn players
Jakobstads BK players
Veikkausliiga players
Expatriate footballers in Estonia
Expatriate footballers in Finland
Armenian expatriate footballers
Armenian expatriate sportspeople in Estonia
Armenian expatriate sportspeople in Finland